Macey may refer to:

Places
 Macey, Aube, a commune in the Aube département, France 
 Macey, Manche, a former commune in the Manche département, France
 Mount Macey, Mac. Robertson Land, Antarctica
 Macey Cone, Australian Territory of Heard Island and McDonald Islands, a hill

People
 Adrian Macey (born 1948), New Zealand diplomat, ambassador to France and formerly to Thailand
 David Macey (1949–2011), English translator and historian
 Dean Macey (born 1977), English decathlete and bobsledder
 Frank Macey (1894–1973), English amateur footballer
 Hubert Macey (1921–2008), Canadian ice hockey player
 John Macey (born 1947), English former football goalkeeper
 Jonathan R. Macey, Yale Law School professor
 Jordan Macey (born 1983), Australian rugby union player
 Lance Macey (1881–1950), New Zealand lawn bowler
 Matt Macey (born 1994), English football goalkeeper
 Reg Macey (born 1936), Australian former politician
 Macey (baseball), baseball player, first name unknown
 Macey Brooks (born 1975), American former National Football League player
 Macey Cruthird (born 1992), American actress
 Macey Harlam (1873–1923), American stage and screen actor
 Macey Stewart (born 1996), Australian racing cyclist

Fictional characters
On the British soap opera Emmerdale:
 Charity Macey
 Declan Macey
 Dermot Macey
 Eliza Macey
 Ella Macey
 Katie Macey
 Megan Macey
 Noah Macey

See also
 Macy (disambiguation)

Unisex given names